Kids of 88 were a New Zealand new wave duo based in Auckland, New Zealand, consisting of Jordan Arts and Sam McCarthy. They are best known for their 2009 single, "My House". They have since signed through Dryden Street to Sony Music and released the album Sugarpills in August 2010. In 2014, the duo stated that 'the [Kids of 88] project has concluded.'

Members
 Jordan Arts – programming/keyboards
 Sam McCarthy – vocals

History

2000–2009: Career beginnings and style
It is known that the two have been best friends for ten years. They attended St Peter's College, Auckland, where they formed the band Incursa, winning the 2004 Smokefreerockquest. Sharing a passion for music, they decided to become musicians. The duo have described their music as "a cross between a late 80s police drama intro theme and a sophisticated super hussy. With sleazy basslines and mind-numbingly catchy hooks, Kids of 88 are all about poking tongues and making sweaty suggestive innuendos."

They cite their influences as "Groove, mood, and slutty arrangements. 16th hi hats and hand claps. Culture and couture, Gangster and glamour".

McCarthy is also a member of the band Goodnight Nurse.

2010–2011: Sugarpills and extended play
In April 2010, Kids of 88 signed a worldwide record deal with Sony Music.

On the back of their debut album release, Kids of 88 are set to tour New Zealand with fellow kiwi indie band The Naked and Famous, the tour will hit the four main centres of Auckland, Wellington, Christchurch and Dunedin beginning 30 September.

At the 2010 New Zealand Music Awards, Kids of 88 won 'Single of the Year' and (with Tim Van Dammen) 'Music Video of the Year' for their single "Just a Little Bit".

In November 2010 they toured Australia and in December 2010 they headed to Europe to support Ke$ha on her tour.

In February 2011 they released an EP which included the track "Sugarpills" and 4 other new ones.

In July 2011 they released an extended Sugarpills version to Australia and the United States known as Sugarpills (Australian Edition) which includes the track Sugarpills and two new songs from the EP released into New Zealand in February.

On 8 August 2011 episode of MTV's Teen Wolf entitled "Formality", they were featured as the live band performing at the Beacon Hills formal. During their on screen set, they played "Just a Little Bit", "Ribbons of Light" and "Universe".

2012: Modern Love
The second studio album, Modern Love was released worldwide on 5 October 2012. The first single "Tucan" was released on 11 May 2012. "Bad Talk" had been confirmed as the second single, with funding for its music video provided by NZ On Air, but has since been changed to "LaLa". Both tracks "Tucan" and "LaLa" had videos released well before the release of the full second album, which were both shot and directed by Levi Beamish. Tracks from the four-week JB Hi-Fi NZ Modern Love pre-order deal include "Bones", "Mercury", "LoveFlow" and "FrenchGreen", adopting the new no-space KidsOf88 look.

Since the release of the album, the duo went on to release a third single from Modern Love, "TheDrug", the music video to which was directed and shot by Sam Kristofski, starring several of the band's friends and neighbours.

On 23 July 2013, the band released a music video for their song "Bad Talk".

Discography

Albums

Studio albums

Extended plays

Singles

As a main artist

As featured artist

Promotional Singles

Music videos

 "Special Problems" is the combined work of Campbell Hooper and Joel Kefali.

Filmography

Television

Awards and nominations

References

External links
 Kids of 88 Official Site
 Facebook Kids of 88 Page

New Zealand indie rock groups
New Zealand new wave musical groups
People educated at St Peter's College, Auckland
New Zealand pop music groups